Biohazard 3 may refer to:

Resident Evil 3: Nemesis, a 1999 video game
Resident Evil 3 (2020 video game), 2020 remake of the above
Resident Evil: Extinction, the third live-action film in the Resident Evil series, released in 2007
Resident Evil: Vendetta, the third CG film in the Resident Evil series, released in 2017
 Biohazard level 3, category to distinguish the severity of biological agents